is a railway station on the Keisei Oshiage Line in Katsushika, Tokyo, Japan, operated by the private railway operator Keisei Electric Railway.

Lines

Station Layout

This station consists of two side platforms serving two tracks.

History
The station opened on 3 November 1912.

Yotsugi

References

Railway stations in Tokyo
Railway stations in Japan opened in 1912